Silene taimyrensis, or Taimyr  catchfly, is a herbaceous perennial in the family Caryophyllaceae. It is native to the Yukon and British Columbia in Canada and to Alaska.  It is found to an elevation of a 1500 meters, growing in exposed subalpine to alpine locations with poor, rocky to sandy soils.  It grows to a height of 40 cm in its native habitat and to twice that height as a garden plant; it has small, white to light pink flowers that grow in terminal clusters. S. taimyrensis is known in the fossil record from the Late Pleistocene.

References

taimyrensis
Flora of North America